Falling Angel is a 1978 horror novel by American writer William Hjortsberg.  Written in a hardboiled detective style with supernatural themes, it was adapted into the 1987 film Angel Heart.

Plot summary
Johnny Favorite, a popular crooner before and during the Second World War, has not been seen or heard of since he was critically wounded during a 1943 Luftwaffe raid on Allied forces in Tunisia. In 1959, private investigator Harry Angel is hired to locate him on behalf of a mysterious client who calls himself Louis Cyphre. During his investigation, Angel finds himself enmeshed in a disturbing occult milieu.

Adaptations
The book was adapted into a 1987 mystery-thriller film entitled Angel Heart starring Mickey Rourke, Robert De Niro, and Lisa Bonet. It was also adapted into an opera by J. Mark Scearce to a libretto by Lucy Thurber. Titled Falling Angel, it premiered at the Brevard Music Center on June 30, 2016, after having initially been commissioned by the Center for Contemporary Opera in New York. The novel was serialized in digest version in Playboy magazine in 1978, winner of Playboy Editorial Award for Best Major Work.

Sequel
A sequel, Angel's Inferno, was published posthumously in 2020.

References

1978 American novels
American horror novels
American thriller novels
Deal with the Devil
American novels adapted into films
Novels adapted into operas
Harcourt (publisher) books